This is a list of fatal alligator attacks in the United States in reverse chronological order by decade. All occurred in the Southeast, where alligators are endemic to wetlands and tidal marshes. The state of Florida, where most attacks and deaths occur, began keeping records of alligator attacks in 1948.

2020s

2010s

2000s

1990s

1980s

1970s

1950s

Pre-1900

See also 
 CrocBITE

Species:
 List of fatal bear attacks in North America
 List of fatal cougar attacks in North America
 List of fatal snake bites in the United States
 List of fatal, unprovoked shark attacks in the United States
 List of wolf attacks in North America
 Fatal dog attacks in the United States

Notes

References

External links
CrocBITE

Alligators and humans
Alligator, United States
Lists of deaths due to animal attacks in the United States